Michael Redvers Green (born 17 September 1951) is a former English cricketer.  Green was a right-handed batsman who fielded as a wicket-keeper.  He was born in Stafford, Staffordshire.

Green made his debut for Staffordshire in the 1971 Minor Counties Championship against Northumberland.  Green played Minor counties cricket for Staffordshire from 1971 to 1979, which included 41 Minor Counties Championship matches.  In 1975, he made his List A debut against Leicestershire in the Gillette Cup.  He made 3 further appearances in List A cricket, the last coming against Sussex in the 1978 Gillette Cup.  In his 4 List A matches, he scored 49 runs at an average of 24.50, with a high score of 27 not out.

References

External links
Michael Green at ESPNcricinfo
Michael Green at CricketArchive

1951 births
Living people
Sportspeople from Stafford
English cricketers
Staffordshire cricketers
Wicket-keepers